Appikatla is a village in Guntur district of the Indian state of Andhra Pradesh. It is located in Bapatla mandal of Tenali revenue division.

Geography 

Governance 

Appikatla Gram Panchayat is the local self-government of the village. There are 10 wards, each represented by an elected ward member. The present sarpanch is vacant, elected by the ward members. The village is administered by the  Bapatla Mandal Parishad at the intermediate level of panchayat raj institutions.

Education 

As per the school information report for the academic year 2018–19, the village has a total of 5 schools. These include one Government School, 2 Zilla/Mandal Parishad and 2 private schools.

Transport 
Appikatla railway station, a Non-Suburban Grade-6 (NSG-6) station in the Vijayawada railway division of the South Coast Railway zone, provides rail connectivity to the village.

See also 
List of villages in Guntur district

References 

Villages in Guntur district